Cechenena mirabilis is a moth of the  family Sphingidae. It is known from the Himalayas in India.

It differs from all other Cechenena species by the blue-green ground colour of the forewing upperside which is overlain by a dark green basal and median pattern. There is a H-shaped patch just distal to the small and indistinct pale discal spot. The thorax upperside is dark green and there are no dorsal lines on the abdomen.

References

Cechenena
Moths described in 1875